Trustee System may refer to:
United Nations trust territories, the successors of the remaining League of Nations mandates
Trustee system (Catholic Church), practices and institutions within certain parishes